Volodymyr Suprun (born 24 January 1994) is a Ukrainian sprinter. He competed in the 4 × 100 metres relay event at the 2015 World Championships in Athletics in Beijing, China.

International competitions

References

External links

EAA profile

1994 births
Living people
Ukrainian male sprinters
World Athletics Championships athletes for Ukraine
Place of birth missing (living people)